Askar Myrzakhmetov (Asqar İsabekūly Myrzahmetov) is a Kazakh politician who held the positions of Counsellor of the Prime Minister of Kazakhstan and First Vice Minister of Agriculture between 1997 and 2006. He was ambassador to Uzbekistan in 2006 and 2007.

Biography 

Askar Myrzakhmetov was born October 1, 1962. He graduated from the Kazakh National Agrarian University, graduate school of the All-Union Research Institute of Livestock. By education — Zooengineer, Candidate of Agricultural Sciences.

He worked as an academic employee in the system of Eastern Department of the All-Union Academy of Agricultural Sciences.   

In 1991 — 1995 — Vice-President of the Joint Stock Company "Republican Construction Exchange" Kazakhstan"", Chairman of the Board of the Association of Exchange of Central Asia and Kazakhstan, "Electronic Store".   

CEO of the investment firm "Tasmo" (1995 — 1996).   

CEO of the Agro-Leasing (1996 — 1999).   

Freelance Advisor of Prime Minister of the Republic of Kazakhstan (1997 — 1999).   

Chairman of the Council of the Forum of Entrepreneurs of Kazakhstan (03.1999 — 08.1999).   

Vice-Minister of Agriculture of the Republic of Kazakhstan (08.1999 — 06.2002).   

In the period from 1999 to 2002 Askar Myshakhmetov headed the Board of Directors, was a member of the Board of Directors of "Prodсorporation".   

From June 2002 — the first vice-minister of agriculture of the Republic of Kazakhstan.   

By decree of the President of Kazakhstan dated August 25, 2005, he was appointed Minister of Agriculture.   

On April 26, 2006, he was appointed Extraordinary and Plenipotentiary Ambassador of the Republic of Kazakhstan in the Republic of Uzbekistan, in this position worked until September 18, 2007.   

From September 2007 to March 2009 — Head of the "National Company" Socio-Entrepreneurship Corporation "Ontustik" (Shymkent, South Kazakhstan region).   

March 4, 2009, appointed akim of the South Kazakhstan region.

August 8, 2015, released from the post of Akim of the South Kazakhstan region and was appointed First Deputy Chairman of the Nur Otan Party.

May 6, 2016, appointed Minister of Agriculture of the Republic of Kazakhstan. June 14, 2016 appointed deputy prime minister and headed the commission on landforms, retaining the post of Minister of Agriculture. December 15, 2017, released from the post of Minister of Agriculture and Deputy Prime Minister.   

January 10, 2018, appointed akim of the Jambyl Region.

February 10, 2020, released from the post of akim of the Jambyl region.

Awards 

 Order of Parasat (2018);
 Order of Kurmet (2010);
 Order of Friendship (September 10, 2013, Russia);
 Medal "20 years of independence of the Republic of Kazakhstan" (2011);
 State Prize of the Republic of Kazakhstan in the field of literature and art (2014).

References

Living people
Kazakhstani businesspeople
Ministers of Agriculture (Kazakhstan)
Ambassadors of Kazakhstan to Uzbekistan
1962 births
Deputy Prime Ministers of Kazakhstan